HSwMS Halland (Hnd) is a submarine in the Swedish Navy.

Gotland-class submarines
Ships built in Malmö
1996 ships
Submarines of Sweden